Agnes of Austria may also refer to:

Agnes of Austria (1154–1182), daughter of Henry II, Duke of Austria, married firstly Stephen III of Hungary, secondly to Herman II, Duke of Carinthia
Agnes of Austria (1281–1364), daughter of Albert I of Germany, married Andrew III of Hungary
Agnes of Austria (1322–1392), daughter of Leopold I, Duke of Austria, married Bolko II the Small
Agnes of Babenberg (1108/13–1160/63), daughter of Leopold III, Margrave of Austria, married Władysław II the Exile
Agnes of Habsburg (1257–1322), daughter of Rudolph I of Germany, married Albert II, Duke of Saxony